Robert La Follette may refer to:

 Robert M. La Follette, Robert Marion "Fighting Bob" La Follette Sr. (1855–1925), an American politician
Robert M. La Follette House, Maple Bluff, Wisconsin, U.S.
Robert M. La Follette School of Public Affairs, University of Wisconsin–Madison, U.S.
Robert M. La Follette High School, Madison, Wisconsin, U.S.
Robert M. La Follette Sr. (Davidson), a statue
 Robert M. La Follette Jr., Robert Marion "Young Bob" La Follette Jr. (1895–1953), an American politician, son of Robert Sr.

See also
La Follette (disambiguation)